Auld Lang Syne is a 1929 British musical film directed by George Pearson and starring Harry Lauder, Dorothy Boyd, and Patrick Aherne. It was originally made as a silent film, but in September 1929 sound was added. It was shot at Cricklewood Studios in Cricklewood, London.

Cast
 Harry Lauder - Sandy McTavish
 Dorothy Boyd - Jill Bray
 Patrick Aherne - Angus McTavish
 Dodo Watts - Marie McTavish
 Hugh E. Wright - Wullie McNab

References

 John Mundy, The British Musical Film (Manchester University Press, 2007)

External links

1929 films
1920s English-language films
Films directed by George Pearson
1929 musical films
British musical films
Films shot at Cricklewood Studios
British black-and-white films
1920s British films